Ioannis "Giannis" Gavriilidis (born 24 January 1982) is a former Greek diver. He competed in the synchronised 10 metre platform, along with Sotirios Trakas, and the 10 metre platform events at the 2004 Summer Olympics in Athens.

References

External links
 

1982 births
Living people
Greek male divers
Olympic divers of Greece
Divers at the 2004 Summer Olympics
Sportspeople from Piraeus